is a retired Japanese male volleyball player. He used to be a part of the Japan men's national volleyball team. On club level, he played for Sakai Blazers.

References

External links
 profile at FIVB.org

1989 births
Living people
Japanese men's volleyball players
People from Fukui Prefecture
Sportspeople from Fukui Prefecture
21st-century Japanese people